The Tucano people (sometimes spelt Tukano) are a group of Indigenous South Americans in the northwestern Amazon, along the                     Vaupés River and the surrounding area. They are mostly in Colombia, but some are in Brazil. They are usually described as being made up of many separate tribes, but that oversimplifies the social and linguistic structure of the region.

Culture 

The Tucano are multilingual because men must marry outside their language group: no man may have a wife who speaks his language, which would be viewed as a kind of incest. Men choose women from various neighboring tribes who speak other languages. Furthermore, on marriage, women move into the men's households or longhouses. Consequently, in any village several languages are used: the language of the men; the various languages spoken by women who originate from different neighboring tribes; and a widespread regional 'trade' language. Children are born into the multilingual environment: the child's father speaks one language (considered the Tucano language), the child's mother another, other women with whom the child has daily contact, and perhaps still others. However, everyone in the community is interested in language-learning so most people can speak most of the languages. 
Multilingualism is taken for granted, and moving from one language to another in the course of a single conversation is very common. In fact, multilingualism is so usual that the Tucano are hardly conscious that they do speak different languages as they shift easily from one to another. They cannot readily tell an outsider how many languages they speak, and they must be suitably prompted to enumerate the languages that they speak and to describe how well they speak each one.

Divisions

As mentioned above, the Tucano practice linguistic exogamy. Members of a linguistic descent group marry outside their own linguistic descent group. As a result, it is normal for Tucano people to speak two, three, or more Tucanoan languages, and any Tucano household (longhouse) is likely to be host to numerous languages. The descent groups (sometimes referred to as tribes) all have their accompanying language; some of the most well known are listed below:

Bara Tukano
Barasana
Cubeo (the Cubeo do not practice exogamy)
Desana
Macuna
Wanano
Tucano (or Tucano Proper)

Subsistence
The Tucano are swidden horticulturalists and grow manioc and other staples in forest clearings. They also hunt, trap, fish, and forage wild plants and animals.

Further reading 
Chernela, Janet M. The Wanano Indians of the Brazilian Amazon: A Sense of Space (1996). .
 Jackson, Jean E. The Fish People - Linguistic Exogamy and Tukanoan Identity in Northwest Amazonia (1983). .
Reichel-Dolmatoff, Gerardo. Rainforest Shamans: Essays on the Tukano Indians of the Northwest Amazon. .

References

External links 

 The Importance of Indigenous Knowledge on the National Museum of Natural History
 Tukano - Indigenous Peoples in Brazil. Instituto Socioambiental

Indigenous peoples in Brazil
Indigenous peoples in Colombia
Indigenous peoples of the Amazon